Koussour Koussour is a drinking water well in the Arta Region of Djibouti.

Overview
It lies next to the RN-9 National Highway. Its population is around 221 residents, mostly Afar.

Nearby towns and villages include Arta (66 km), Tadjoura (85 km) and Sagallo (52 km).

References

Populated places in Djibouti
Arta Region